Tony Hunt Sr.  (24 August 1942 – 15 December 2017) was a Canadian First Nations artist noted for his KwaGulth style paintings and totem poles, which he carved from single cedar logs.

Early life
Tony Hunt was born in 1942 at the Kwakwaka'wakw community of Alert Bay, British Columbia, and was the oldest of six sons of Henry Hunt and Helen Hunt. The youth received early training from his maternal grandfather Mungo Martin. Through his maternal line, Hunt was a hereditary chief of the Kwakwaka'wakw.

His father was a professional woodcarver. Hunt and his brothers are also descendants of the renowned ethnologist George Hunt (Tlingit), who collected hundreds of Kwakwaka'wakw artworks for an exhibition at the 1893 World's Columbian Exposition in Chicago.

Career
After his grandfather Martin's death in 1962, Hunt became assistant carver to his father Henry Hunt at Thunderbird Park in Victoria, B.C. His younger brothers, Richard Hunt and Stanley C. Hunt, also became professional carvers. In 1970 Hunt opened the Arts of the Raven Gallery in Victoria.

In 1984 Kraft Foods, Inc. commissioned Tony Hunt to carve a replacement totem pole, Kwanusila (Thunderbird), for a Kwakwaka'wakw pole donated by James L. Kraft, industrialist, to the city of Chicago in 1929. It was installed at the waterfront of Lake Michigan. After decades in the public park, the pole had suffered weather deterioration and vandalism. With new appreciation for its historic and cultural value, the original pole was sent to the museum in British Columbia for preservation and study. Kwanusila is installed at the lakeside park.

Death
Chief Tony Hunt died in Campbell River on 15 December 2017.

Honors
Hunt was awarded the Order of British Columbia in 2010.

Sources
 Hunt, Ross (2007) "The Hunt Family's Trip to West Germany to Attend the Bundesgarten Show."  Anthropology News, vol. 48, no. 2, pp. 20–21.
 Macnair, Peter L., Alan L. Hoover, and Kevin Neary (1984) The Legacy: Tradition and Innovation in Northwest Coast Indian Art.  Vancouver, B.C.: Douglas & McIntyre.

References

External links
Chief Tony Hunt (Nakapnkim)

1942 births
2017 deaths
20th-century Canadian sculptors
21st-century Canadian sculptors
21st-century Canadian male artists
20th-century First Nations sculptors
Canadian male sculptors
20th-century Canadian male artists
21st-century First Nations people
Artists from British Columbia
Kwakwa̱ka̱ʼwakw woodcarvers
Members of the Order of British Columbia
People from Alert Bay
Totem pole carvers
Members of the Royal Canadian Academy of Arts